Uncle Phil may refer to two individuals, one real and one fictional:

 Phil Knight (born 1938), co-founder of Nike, Inc., who is affectionately called "Uncle Phil" by students at the University of Oregon, due to his philanthropic contributions to the university
 Philip Banks (The Fresh Prince of Bel-Air), a fictional character known as Uncle Phil